17th Annual GLAAD Media Awards (2006) were presented at four separate ceremonies: March 27 in New York City; April 8 at the Kodak Theatre in Los Angeles; May 25 in Miami; and June 10 in San Francisco. The awards honor films, television shows, musicians and works of journalism that fairly, accurately and inclusively represent the LGBT community and issues relevant to the community.

Special Recognition
Vito Russo Award: David LaChapelle
Vanguard Award: Charlize Theron
Golden Gate Award: Jennifer Tilly
Davidson/Valentini Award: Ron Cowen
Stephen F. Kolzak Award: Melissa Etheridge
Valentia Award: Fey
Pioneer Award: Rev. Cecil Williams
Visibilidad Award: Richard Pérez-Feria
Special Recognition: "First Day of My Life," Bright Eyes music video, dir. John Cameron Mitchell

Winners and nominees
Winners are presented in bold.

Outstanding Film - Wide Release
Brokeback Mountain (Focus Features)
Capote (Sony Pictures Classics)
The Family Stone (20th Century Fox)
Kiss Kiss Bang Bang (Warner Bros.)
Rent (Sony Pictures)
Outstanding Film - Limited Release
Beautiful Boxer (Regent Releasing/here! Films)
Mysterious Skin (Strand Releasing/Antidote Films)
Saving Face (Sony Pictures Classics)
Transamerica (The Weinstein Company)
Walk on Water (Samuel Goldwyn Films)
Outstanding Documentary
American Experience: Kinsey (PBS)
Middle Sexes: Redefining He and She (HBO)
Same Sex America (Showtime)
TransGeneration (The Sundance Channel/Logo)
We Are Dad (Showtime)
Outstanding Drama Series
Commander in Chief (ABC)
The L Word (Showtime)
Queer as Folk (Showtime)
Six Feet Under (HBO)
South of Nowhere (The N)
Outstanding Comedy Series
Out of Practice  (CBS)
Shameless  (BBC America)
Will & Grace (NBC)
Outstanding Individual Episode (in a series without a regular gay character)
"Alien" - Law & Order: SVU (NBC)
"Best Friends" - Cold Case (CBS)
"Pilot" - My Name is Earl (NBC)
"Someone's in the Kitchen with Daddy" - What I Like About You (The WB)
"Transitions" - Without a Trace (CBS)
Outstanding Television Movie or Mini-Series
The Long Firm (BBC America)
Partner(s) (Lifetime)
Outstanding Reality Program
The Amazing Race 7 (CBS)
America's Next Top Model 5 (UPN)
"Boone Luffey/Gillespie" - Wife Swap (ABC)
Queer Eye (Bravo)
"Straight/Gay" - 30 Days (FX)
Outstanding Daily Drama
General Hospital (ABC)
Passions (NBC)
Outstanding Talk Show Episode
"Fighting for My Children" - Dr. Phil
"Twins: Identical But Different" - The Montel Williams Show
"When I Knew I Was Gay" - The Oprah Winfrey Show
"When Your Identical Twin Has a Sex Change" - The Oprah Winfrey Show
Outstanding TV Journalism - Newsmagazine
"Becoming Diane" - 20/20 (ABC)
"Gay Rodeo" - Only in America (Discovery Times Channel)
"Lady Lions: Alleged Discrimination" - Outside the Lines (ESPN)
"Lucky" - Dateline NBC (NBC)
"The Mirror" - Nightline (ABC)
Outstanding TV Journalism - News Segment
"Andrew Goldstein" - ESPN SportsCenter (ESPN)
"Coming Out" - Live From... (CNN)
"Peter Hams" - ESPN SportsCenter (ESPN)
"School Outing" - Anderson Cooper 360° (CNN)
"Secret Sex Lives" - Anderson Cooper 360° (CNN)
Outstanding Newspaper Article
"A House Divided" by Laura Bond (Westword)
"The New Radical" by Kim Martineau (The Hartford Courant)
"Paradise Lost" by Michelle Boorstein (The Washington Post)
"The Stewards of Gay Washington" by Anne Hull (The Washington Post)
"When an Employee Switches Gender, What's a Company to Do?" by Stephanie Armour (USA Today)
Outstanding Newspaper Columnist
Marta Donayre (El Observador)
Margery Eagan (Boston Herald)
Mark Morford (San Francisco Chronicle)
Andy Praschak (The San Juan Star)
Deb Price (The Detroit News)
Outstanding Newspaper Overall Coverage
San Francisco Chronicle
Seattle Post-Intelligencer
USA Today
The Washington Post
Wisconsin State-Journal
Outstanding Magazine Article
"A Down Low Dirty Shame" by Joshunda Sanders (Bitch)
"For the Soul of the Church" by Ethan Vesely-Flad (Color Lines)
"The Gay Rodeo Rides Again" by Michael Joseph Gross (Details)
"The Murder of a Boy Named Gwen" by Bob Moser (Rolling Stone)
"What's in a Name?" by Beth Greenfield (Time Out New York)
Outstanding Magazine Overall Coverage
AsianWeek
Newsweek
People
Time
Time Out New York
Outstanding Digital Journalism Article
"Debajo del Arcoiris" by Emily Alpert (IntheFray.com)
"Gender Outlaws" by Emily Alpert (IntheFray.com)
"The Lowdown on the Downlow" by Bruce Dixon (BlackCommentator.com)
"Now I Get to be Like Everybody Else" by Greg Garber (ESPN.com)
"Turning Off Gays" by Mark Benjamin (Salon.com)
Outstanding Music Artist
Antony and the Johnsons, I Am a Bird Now
Melissa Etheridge, Greatest Hits: The Road Less Traveled
Girlyman, Little Star
Sharon Isbin, Rodrigo, Villa-Lobos, Ponce: Guitar Concertos
Amy Ray, Prom
Outstanding Comic Book
Gotham Central by Greg Rucka and Ed Brubaker (DC Comics)
Strangers in Paradise by Terry Moore (Abstract Studio)
Top Ten: The Forty-Niners by Alan Moore (ABC Comics/Wildstorm)
Y: The Last Man by Brian K. Vaughn (Vertigo/DC Comics)
Young Avengers by Allan Heinberg (Marvel)
Outstanding Advertising - Electronic
"Cupid" - MTV
"Guy Watcher" - Diet Pepsi
"New Boyfriend" - Orbitz
"Signs" - mtvU
Outstanding Advertising - Print
"Partnership Registry" - ABC Carpet and Home
"So What's Cooking in the Kitchen?" - GE Monogram
"There's One." - American Express
Outstanding Los Angeles Theater
Bunbury by Tom Jacobson
''I Am My Own Wife by Doug WrightPorcelain by Chay Yew
A Pebble in My Shoe: The Life and Times of John Shelby Spong by Colin Cox
Pera Palas by Sinan Unel
Outstanding New York Theater: Broadway & Off-Broadway
Border/Clash: A Litany of Desire by Staceyann Chin
The Color Purple book by Marsha Norman, based on the novel by Alice Walker
Ghetto Superstar (The Man That I Am) by Billy PorterOedipus at Palm Springs by The Five Lesbian BrothersSwimming in the Shallows by Adam Bock
Outstanding New York Theater: Off-Off-Broadway
Busted Jesus Comix by David Johnston
Christine Jorgensen Reveals created by Bradford Louryk
Dress Suits to Hire by Holly Hughes in collaboration with Peggy Shaw and Lois Weaver
Golden Age by Roberto Aguirre-SacasaThe Lightning Field'' by David Ozanich

External links
17th Annual GLAAD Media Awards
GLAAD Website

References

17th
2006 awards
2006 in LGBT history
Lists of LGBT-related award winners and nominees